Bidens bidentoides is an uncommon North American species of flowering plant in the family Asteraceae. It is native to the northeastern and east-central parts of the United States, the coastal plain of the States of Maryland, Delaware, Pennsylvania, and New Jersey plus the region around the Hudson River estuary in New York. Common name is Delmarva beggar-ticks, in reference to the Delmarva Peninsula in Delaware, eastern Maryland, and eastern Virginia.

Bidens bidentoides is an annual  herb up to 90 cm (3 feet) tall. It usually produces flower heads one at a time, the heads containing both disc florets and ray florets. The species grows along the banks of streams and estuaries.

References

External links
Friends for the Abbott Marshlands, Aree estuarine beggar-ticks
Bob Cunningham | all galleries >> Threatened and endangered plants in NJ > Bidens bidentoides- Estuary Beggar Ticks 

bidentoides
Flora of the Eastern United States
Plants described in 1841